The 2005 World Junior Curling Championships were held from March 3 to 13 at the Pinerolo Palaghiaccio in Pinerolo, Italy.

Men

Teams

Round-robin standings
Final Round Robin Standings

Round-robin results

Draw 1
Thursday, March 3, 14:00

Draw 2
Friday, March 4, 09:00

Draw 3
Friday, March 4, 19:00

Draw 4
Saturday, March 5, 14:00

Draw 5
Sunday, March 6, 09:00

Draw 6
Sunday, March 6, 19:00

Draw 7
Monday, March 7, 14:00

Draw 8
Tuesday, March 8, 09:00

Draw 9
Tuesday, March 8, 19:00

Draw 11
Wednesday, March 9, 19:00

Draw 10
Wednesday, March 9, 14:00

Draw 12
Thursday, March 10, 14:00

Playoffs

Semifinals
Saturday, March 12, 12:00

Bronze-medal game
Sunday, March 13, 09:00

Gold-medal game
Sunday, March 13, 13:00

Women

Teams

Round-robin standings
Final Round Robin Standings

Round-robin results

Draw 1
Thursday, March 3, 09:00

Draw 2
Thursday, March 3, 19:00

Draw 3
Friday, March 4, 14:00

Draw 4
Saturday, March 5, 09:00

Draw 5
Saturday, March 5, 19:00

Draw 6
Sunday, March 6, 14:00

Draw 7
Monday, March 7, 09:00

Draw 8
Monday, March 7, 19:00

Draw 9
Tuesday, March 8, 14:00

Draw 10
Wednesday, March 9, 09:00

Draw 11
Wednesday, March 9, 19:00

Draw 12
Thursday, March 10, 09:00

Tiebreakers
Thursday, March 10, 19:00

Playoffs

Semifinals
Friday, March 11, 19:00

Bronze-medal game
Saturday, March 12, 12:00

Gold-medal game
Saturday, March 12, 17:00

External links

World Junior Curling Championships, 2005
World Junior Curling Championships
Province of Turin
2005 in Italian sport
International curling competitions hosted by Italy
March 2005 sports events in Europe
2005 in youth sport